District 17 of the Texas Senate is a senatorial district that currently serves portions of Brazoria, Fort Bend, and Harris county in the U.S. state of Texas.

The current Senator from District 17 is Joan Huffman.

Top 5 biggest cities in district
District 17 has a population of 804,162 with 605,764 that is at voting age from the 2010 census.

Election history
Election history of District 22 from 1992.

2018

2014

2012

2010

2008

2006

2002

1998

1994

1992

District officeholders

Notes

References

17
Brazoria County, Texas
Fort Bend County, Texas
Harris County, Texas